Yeniceoba is a town in the province of Konya in Turkey. It is located in the district of Cihanbeyli. The highway distance from Yeniceoba to Konya is 130 km. The population of the municipality is 5,599 as of 2012.

Information 
The town is populated by Kurds.

About 5,000 people emigrated from the town to Denmark.

Politics

2007 general election

2011 general election

2015 general election

2018 general election

Twin towns
  Ishøj in Denmark since 2006.

Notable people 

 Fehmi Demir

References

Populated places in Konya Province
Kurdish settlements in Turkey